Ang Dalawang Mrs. Reyes is a Filipino comedy film starring Angelica Panganiban and Judy Ann Santos. The film is directed by Jun Robles Lana and is produced by Star Cinema, Quantum Films and The IdeaFirst Company.

The film is Star Cinema's opening salvo for 2018 and will be the first movie to pair Santos with Panganiban whom she last worked with in the 2001 soap opera Sa Puso Ko Iingatan Ka. It also marks the reunion of the original Mara Clara stars, Judy Ann Santos and Gladys Reyes

The film introduces the characters of Santos and Panganiban, a pair of devoted wives who find their husbands to be in a secret, gay relationship.

Cast 

Judy Ann Santos as Lianne Reyes 
Angelica Panganiban as Cindy Reyes
JC de Vera as Felix Reyes 
Joross Gamboa as Gary Reyes
Gladys Reyes as Betsy Reyes
Carmi Martin as Amanda Reyes
Nico Antonio as Steve Reyes
Andrea Brillantes as Macey Reyes
Kim Molina as Aira
Cai Cortez as Baby
Quark Henares as Gilbert
Wilma Doesn't as Martina

Awards and nominations

2019 Box Office Entertainment Awards
Winner – Comedy Actress of the Year  (Judy Ann Santos & Angelica Panganiban)

FAMAS Award (Nomination)
Best Actress – (Judy Ann Santos)
Best Picture – (Jun Lana)

3rd EDDYS AWARDS (Nomination)
Best Actress – (Judy Ann Santos)
Best Supporting Actor – (Joross Gamboa)

37th Luna Award (Nomination)
Best Editing (Maynard Pattaui and Edlyn Tallada-Abuel)

PMPC Star Awards for Movies (Nomination)
Best Actress – (Judy Ann Santos)
Best Picture – (Jun Lana)
Movie Screenwriter of the Year (Jun Lana)
Movie Production Designer of the Year (Marxie Maolen Fadul)
Movie Editor of the Year (Maynard Pattaui)
Movie Musical Scorer (Emerzon Texon)
Movie Sound Engineer of the Year (Lamberto Casas Jr and Albert Michael Idioma)

References

External links
 

Quantum Films films
Philippine comedy films
Films directed by Jun Robles Lana